Jabučje is a village in Valjevo municipality Lajkovac city district in the Šumadija District of central Serbia.

It has a population of 2000.

External links

Satellite map at Maplandia.com

Populated places in Šumadija District
Valjevo